Censi may refer to:

 Censi (surname), including a list of people with the name
 Les Censi, a 1935 film by Antonin Artaud
 Censuses, owing to its plural form in Latin

See also
 Capite censi, the "head count" of ancient Rome
 Cenci (disambiguation)
 The Cenci, by Percy Bysshe Shelley, sometimes written Censi